Dr. Elaine Cassidy is a fictional character from the BBC soap opera Doctors, portrayed by Janet Dibley. She made her first appearance during the series 12 episode "Frozen", broadcast on 31 August 2010. She departed Doctors on 28 September 2012.

Storylines
Elaine is involved in the child abuse case of two-year-old Scarlet Hammond. Elaine is the general practitioner for Scarlet's social worker; Najmah Hammed (Effie Woods). A mentally ill patient of Heston Carter (Owen Brenman), Ed Harman suffers with his illness and struggles to integrate back into society after leaving Afghanistan. Ed tries to kill Heston at the Campus Surgery, but Elaine hits Ed over the head with a fire extinguisher. Elaine stays at the hospital with Ed until he is released, and afterwards, she invites him back to her house as a lodger.

Development
On 28 May 2010, Doctors series producer Peter Lloyd told media entertainment website Digital Spy that a new female doctor, Elaine would be introduced to Doctors. Lloyd said Elaine would "have a new take on the surgery" and "be very interesting to have around". Former EastEnders actress Janet Dibley was cast in the role of Elaine Cassidy. Dibley described Elaine as "a bit New Age" and "heavily into meditation". On joining the show, Dibley commented: "Doctors is filmed in Birmingham three months ahead of transmission and the schedule is very intense. We have to be on set by 7am and work with three film units at three different locations, juggling up to 12 scripts at any one time. But I’m loving every second of it."

In her introductory scenes, Elaine impresses Daniel Granger (Matthew Chambers) and his colleagues during her interview at The Mill Health Centre, and she "wows" them with her passion for patient care. Elaine is initially torn about accepting the job, as her married lover Paul Foster (Steven Pacey) has promised to buy them a new home in the country. But when she learns that he has no intention of leaving his wife for her, she has a rethink and takes the position. The character's eccentric persona leads her to clash with Zara Carmichael (Elisabeth Dermot Walsh), who is "outraged" when Elaine fills their shared office with various bohemian items. Elaine manages to befriend Charlie Bradfield (Philip McGough) and Julia Parsons (Diane Keen), who is helped by Elaine's positive reinforcement techniques.

In September 2012, the character was involved in a week of BBC Red Button episodes focusing on the return of her former lover and murderer Harrison Kellor (James Larkin), who changes his plea in the Lauren Porter murder case. During the storyline, Elaine meets Alex Redmond (Stuart Laing), who is the husband of one of Harrison's possible victims; his wife had an affair with Harrison, and she went missing after the affair ended. Alex asks Elaine for help, putting her in a "difficult position". A statement said: "Discovering that Alex's wife went missing after an affair with Harrison, Elaine is forced to consider that he may have killed other women too. Plagued by phone calls from Harrison in prison, will Elaine be able to confront her former lover and resist his charms?". Series producer Mike Hobson finished by saying, "Lauren's murder was one of Doctors most popular storylines, and this Red Button event picks up on one of the show's most chilling villains, building across the week to a dramatic conclusion".

Not long after the announcement of the spin-off episodes, Daniel Kilkelly of Digital Spy confirmed that Dibley's character Elaine would leave Doctors at the conclusion of the Harrison storyline.

Reception
In 2010, Dibley was longlisted for the British Soap Award for Best Actress for her portrayal of Elaine. She received another nomination for the award in 2011. Andrew Liddle of The Yorkshire Times branded Elaine a "memorable" character.

References

External links
 Elaine Cassidy at BBC Online

Doctors (2000 TV series) characters
Female characters in television
Fictional British medical doctors
Fictional female doctors
Television characters introduced in 2010